Tennant Creek is a town and a locality in the Northern Territory of Australia.

Tennant Creek may also refer to the following places in the Northern Territory:

Tennant Creek Airport, an airport
Tennant Creek Telegraph Station, a historic building
Town of Tennant Creek, a former local government area
Tennant Creek Hospital Outpatients Department, former hospital now used as a museum

See also
Tennant (disambiguation)
Church of Christ the King, Tennant Creek